Uthirakosamangai, also known as Mangalanatha Swamy temple, is a Shaiva temple situated near Ramanathapuram in the Ramanathapuram district of Tamil Nadu. The temple is much older and the structure as it exists today is believed to be built by the Pandya kings, Achutappa Nayak (1529–1542 CE), Muthuveerappar and other kings of Ramanthapuram at various times. The temple has been glorified by the hymns of 9th-century saint Manickavasagar and 15th-century saint Arunagirinathar.

The temple is considered sacred along the lines of Ramanathapuram, Sethu Madhava Theertham and Lakshmana Theertham. The temple is a prominent tourist destination of Ramanathapuram district.

The temple has numerous shrines, with those of Mangalanathar, Mangalambigai and Natarajar being the most prominent. The temple has six daily rituals at various times from 5:30 a.m. to 8 p.m., and six yearly festivals on its calendar. The temple is maintained and administered by the Hindu Religious and Endowment Board of the Government of Tamil Nadu.

Legend

As per Hindu legend, once hundreds of rishis (ascetics) performed penance worshipping Shiva. Shiva told the rishis that he would appear in the form of a fireball to acknowledge the penance of Mandothari, the wife of king Ravana in Sri Lanka. Shiva appeared in the form a small child in Ravana's palace. Ravana lifted the beautiful child and there was a small wound out of it. Simultaneously, there was a fireball out of the Agni Theertham (temple tank), which the rishis felt were on account of Shiva attacking Ravana. Out of thousand, 999 killed themselves by falling in the fire, while one of them remained to save the vedic books. Shiva was pleased by the rishi and appeared as Sahasralingam (thousand lingams) for the 999 and one more for himself in the temple. The single rishi was believed to have emerged later as Manickavasgar in his later birth.

History

Uthira Kosa Mangai is a tiny hamlet. It is considered to be one of the very ancient Hindu temples which Tamil literature describes as "Mann Mundhiyo Mangai Mundhiyo?" meaning "Did the mud (mann) come first or is the Mangai (The Female Deity of the Temple)?". This is the place where Siva transferred the secrets of Vedas to Parvati. Uthiram means (upadesam) kosam (secrets) Parvati (Mangai) hence this place is known as Uthira Kosa Mangai. The temple is believed to be built by the Pandya kings. Achutappa Nayak (1529–1542 A.D.), a Hindu ruler of Thanjavur, Muthuveerappar and other kings of Ramanthapuram Sethupathy dynasty have contributed to the temple. The last renovation was carried out by the queen of Ramanthapuram. The temple is maintained and administered by the Hindu Religious and Endowment Board of the Government of Tamil Nadu.

Architecture
The temple is located 32 km East from Paramakkudi and 17 km west from Ramanathapuram. The temple has a seven-tiered rajagopuram (gateway tower). The temple has numerous shrines, with those of Mangalanathar, Mangalambigai and Natarajar being the most prominent. There are separate shrines for Mangalanathar (Shiva) in the form of lingam and Mangalambigai. A hall of Saharasralingam has a thousand lingams enshrined in it. At the entrance of the main precinct, the temple features exquisite stone carvings of Yali (mythological dragon), depicted with a rolling stone ball inside its mouth. The granite images of the deities Ganesha (son of Shiva and god of wisdom), Murugan (son of Shiva), Nandi (Representative of all our Souls) and Navagraha (nine planetary deities) are located in the hall leading to the sanctum. As in other Shiva temples of Tamil Nadu, the first precinct or the walls around the sanctum of Erumbeeswarar has images of Thenmugaparaman (Dakshinamurthy-Shiva as the Teacher), Durga (warrior-goddess) and Chandikeswarar (a saint and devotee of Shiva).

Worship and festivals
The temple priests perform the puja (rituals) during festivals and on a daily basis. Like other Shiva temples of Tamil Nadu, the priests belong to the Shaiva community, a Brahmin sub-caste. The temple rituals are performed six times a day; Ushathkalam at 5:30 a.m., Kalasanthi at 8:00 a.m., Uchikalam at 10:00 a.m., Sayarakshai at 5:00 p.m., Irandamkalam at 7:00 p.m. and Ardha Jamam at 8:00 p.m. Each ritual comprises four steps: abhisheka (sacred bath), alangaram (decoration), naivethanam (food offering) and deepa aradanai (waving of lamps) for all the deities in the temple. The worship is held amidst music with nagaswaram (pipe instrument), religious instructions in the Vedas (sacred texts) read by priests and prostration by worshippers in front of the temple mast. The major festival of the temple are Tirukalyana Vaibhavam (sacred marriage) during the Tamil month of Chittirai (April–May), Vasanthotsavam during Vaigasi (May–June), Pathunal Siva Uthsavam during Aaani (July–August), Annabishekam during Aipasi (October–November), Tiruvathidirai during Margazhi (December–January) and Sivarathri during Masi (February–March). The Tiruvathidirai festival in December attracts a large number of tourists.

Religious significance

The temple is considered sacred along the lines of Ramanathapuram, Sethu Madhava Theertham and Lakshmana Theertham. The emerald image of Nataraja is anointed with sandal paste round the year except on Tiruvathidirai festival day when special worship is practiced. It is believed that even small vibrations can damage the image and hence no percussion instruments are used during worship practises. The front hall has lingams made of Padigam (spatika), that are anointed with cooked rice every afternoon. As per Hindu legend, Vishnu and Brahma contested for superiority, Shiva appeared as a flame, and challenged them to find his source. Brahma took the form of a swan, and flew to the sky to see the top of the flame, while Vishnu became the boar Varaha, and sought its base. Neither Brahma nor Vishnu could find the source, and while Vishnu conceded his defeat, Brahma lied with the help of a thazhambu (Pandanus odorifer flower / Screw Pine Flower / Ketaki flower) and said he had found the pinnacle. In punishment, Shiva ordained that Brahma would never have temples on earth in his worship and all Shiva temples do not use thazhambu during worship practises. This is one such temple where thazhambu is still used for worship practises. This story is found in Shaivaite scriptures.

Manickavasagar, the 9th century Tamil saivite saint poet has revered Mangalanathar and the temple in his verses in Thiruvasakam, compiled as the Eighth Tirumurai. Arunagirinathar, a 15th-century Tamil poet has composed Tamil hymns glorifying Murugan in the temple. As per Hindu legend, Muruga was awarded the Airavata (white elephant) of celestial deity Indra at this place.

References

External links

Hindu temples in Ramanathapuram district
Shiva temples in Tamil Nadu